Ivan Gerald Mauger  (4 October 1939 – 16 April 2018) was a New Zealand motorcycle speedway rider. He won a record six World Championships (Finals), a feat equalled only with the inclusion of the Speedway GP Championships by Tony Rickardsson of Sweden who won one World Final and five GP Championships. Mauger rode for several British teams – Wimbledon Dons, Newcastle Diamonds, Belle Vue Aces, Exeter Falcons, and the Hull Vikings. In 2010, Mauger was named an FIM Legend for his motorcycling achievements.

Mauger and his wife of over 60 years, Raye, lived on Australia's Gold Coast. He was an active supporter of speedway, attending many meetings throughout the Australian season, as well as the Speedway Grand Prix of New Zealand, held at the Western Springs Stadium in Auckland.

Career

Wimbledon
Mauger first arrived in the UK as a 17-year-old aboard the SS Rangitoto, which docked at Tilbury in 1957, with his teenage bride Raye, renting a one-bedroom flat in Wimbledon around the corner from Plough Lane where Moore and Briggs reigned as the twin 'kings of the cinders'.

"Without Ronnie, there would have been no Briggo and no Ivan Mauger; whenever he came home to New Zealand it was like the arrival of Elvis. He was our Pelé, if you like."

Inspired by the deeds of Moore, from the age of 12, Mauger dedicated himself to becoming speedway's champion of the world, working as a delivery boy for a local chemist in Christchurch after school and in the holidays to save money for his first racing machine.

"Everyone thought I had wealthy parents because I could afford to buy a bike before I was 16 but for three years I never bought an ice-cream, a Coca-Cola or anything like that. After I left school I had two jobs – as did Raye – and that's how we saved enough money to come to England when we were little more than children."

Mauger's great adventure began at Plough Lane where he rode in the second-half 'faces of the future' races and assisted Mac the groundsman.

"I never, ever felt I was going to work for the simple reason that I just loved the atmosphere of being in Wimbledon Stadium. I cleaned the dressing rooms, the toilets, the pits and the workshop. I helped Mac work on the track, I weeded the tulip beds and on Monday afternoons I had to cut the grass out in the centre before the speedway meeting. And not just any old cut would do for Ronnie. It had to be mowed in one direction then the other, just like Wembley Stadium."

Newcastle
A major breakthrough in his career occurred in 1963 when he returned to England with Raye and his young family to join Mike Parker's Provincial league team Newcastle Diamonds, though he did ride in a few meetings for the Wimbledon Dons in the National League during this season. In 1966 he qualified for his first World Final where he finished fourth, and won the first of his six record breaking World Championships in 1968. After a public falling out with Parker, Mauger put in a transfer request in December 1968, stating that the mental strain of riding with Newcastle was endangering his health.

Belle Vue
Mauger joined the Belle Vue Aces in 1969, where he enjoyed his greatest league team achievements. As a Belle Vue Ace he won the title in 1970, 1971 and 1972, thereby becoming the only rider to complete the 'Triple Crown'. In 1969 Mauger finished with a British League record average of 11.67. He dropped only 13 points from his 37 completed League & Speedway Star KO Cup matches. During these matches he recorded 22 full maximums, and 3 paid maximums.

Exeter
Mauger joined the Exeter Falcons in 1973. In 1977 wearing the Exeter colours he equalled Ove Fundin's then-record of five World Championship wins.

Hull
In 1978 he joined the Hull Vikings, winning his last and record sixth world title in 1979. He left Hull in 1981, but returned in 1984 at the age of 44 for Exeter where he competed in home meetings.

Australasia
In his home country of New Zealand, Ivan Mauger is considered a national sporting hero. He has won the New Zealand Championship on two occasions (1974 and 1981), and scored his first podium in the championship with second in 1959 behind then dual World Champion Barry Briggs. Surprisingly considering his successful career, Mauger didn't place (or ride) in the NZ Championship again until his 1974 championship. His only other podium in the championship was in 1979 when he placed third behind Larry Ross and Mitch Shirra.

Adelaide based Speedway promoter Kym Bonython signed Mauger to ride the 1960/61 Australian season based at the Rowley Park Speedway. Mauger had considerable success riding in Australia throughout his career. In 1962 he was the Australian Long Track Champion, as well as the Victorian and Queensland State Champion. He also finished runner up in the 1962 Australian Solo Championship in Rockhampton (Qld) behind star New South Wales based rider "Cowboy" Bob Sharp. He would repeat his Victorian Championship win in 1963, and would finish third in the Australian Championship in the same year. Ten years later in 1973, Mauger would win the Western Australian State Championship, held at the  Claremont Speedway in Perth.

Other than Bonython, whom Mauger rates as his favourite Australian promoter, he also had a great relationship with longtime Claremont Speedway promoter Con Migro and appeared at Claremont for two meetings in January for 13 straight years. It was during this time that Mauger won the "Sunday Times King of Claremont" meeting in 1973, 1980, 1981 and 1983.

After losing the 1960 Australian Long track championship in Port Pirie in South Australia when his bike seized after leading for 5½ of 6 laps, Mauger credits advice he received from Australia's 1951 and 1952 World Champion Jack Young (whose home track was Rowley Park when Mauger was based for the season) for steering him on the path to becoming a World Champion himself. Young told Mauger that it isn't the fastest rider who wins the World Championship, it's the rider who at the end of the meeting had scored the most points and that to get there he had to conserve his bike to make sure he finished. Being the fastest rider didn't mean much if he led a race until half a lap from home but had pushed the bike beyond its limits and didn't finish. Ironically the same fate awaited Mauger in the 1961 Australian Long track Championship when his clutch gave out after leading 4½ laps, but he would make amends and win the title in 1962 at Port Pirie.

Ivan Mauger was the Australasian Grand Prix winner in 1971, 1972 and 1973 at the Liverpool Speedway in Sydney (on the original  track). He later would win the Australasian Championship in 1977 at the Sydney Showground Speedway, and in 1981 again at Liverpool, this time on the  track built onto the infield in 1974 when the main track became a paved oval.

Mauger rode his last meeting in Australia back where he first rode in the country in Adelaide. Mauger rode in the South Australia 150 Jubilee at the Wayville Showground in 1986. There he was presented with the winners trophy by his idol Jack Young.

International
Ivan Mauger is considered to be the best speedway rider ever and was voted as the "Greatest Rider of the 20th Century". He jointly holds the record for most Speedway World Championship wins with Sweden's Tony Rickardsson with six wins each, one in front of Swedish legend Ove Fundin.

Mauger won the Individual Speedway World Championship in 1968, 1969, 1970, 1972, 1977 and 1979. He was runner up in 1971, 1973 and 1974, and third in 1967. Mauger's second place in 1971 at the Ullevi Stadium in Sweden was to the man whom he not only taught to ride a speedway bike but would become his great friend and rival throughout the 1970s, Denmark's Ole Olsen.

Representing New Zealand, Mauger was the Speedway World Pairs Champion in 1969 with Bob Andrews (1969 was the unofficial World Championship), and 1970 with Ronnie Moore. The 1970 Pairs Championship held at the Malmö Stadion in Malmö, Sweden, was the first official FIM World Championship held for Pairs. He would finish runner up in the championship in 1971, 1972, 1978 and 1981, before one last podium in 1984 when he finished third with Mitch Shirra.

Mauger was also the Speedway World Team Cup Champion in 1968, 1969 and 1971 while riding for Great Britain (the British team regularly consisted of riders from the Commonwealth nations). He would win the title again in 1979 as captain of New Zealand.

During his career, Ivan Mauger also raced in the World Long Track Championship, winning the title in 1971, 1972 and 1976, bringing his total of World Championships in speedway racing to 15. Mauger was also runner up at the Longtrack Championship in 1974 and 1975, beaten both times by West Germany's Egon Müller, who himself would go on to win the Speedway World Championship in 1983.

Mauger's 15 World Championships sees him sit third on world titles won just behind Denmark's Erik Gundersen who won 17. Another Dane Hans Nielsen holds the record with 22 World Championships, though unlike Mauger or Gundersen he never won the World Long Track Championship.

Honours and awards
Mauger was appointed a Member of the Order of the British Empire in the 1976 New Year Honours, for services to speedway riding. In the 1989 New Year Honours, he was promoted to Officer of the Order of the British Empire.

Mauger was an inaugural inductee into the New Zealand Sports Hall of Fame in 1990. He was voted the prestigious Millennium Man of Speedway by the readers of Speedway Star and Vintage Speedway Magazine in December 1999. He was selected by the Olympic Committee to carry the Olympic Torch at the Sydney Games, an honour which he performed on 12 June 2000.

In 1970, two men in the USA named George Wenn and Ray Bokelman said that if Ivan Mauger won his third World Final in a row at Wrocław (Poland), they would have the winning bike gold plated. Mauger duly won the World Final that year, and true to their promise, the bike was taken to America and Gold plated, and so was born the "Triple Crown Special". The machine is on display at Canterbury Museum in Christchurch, New Zealand.

Later life and death
Mauger was president of World Speedway Riders' Association from 2007 to 2008. He died in Gold Coast, Queensland, Australia, on 16 April 2018.

Titles
 World Champion: 1968, 1969, 1970, 1972, 1977, 1979 – R/Up 1971, 1973, 1974
 New Zealand Sportsperson of the Year (Halberg Award) 1977 and 1979.
 Long Track World Champion 1971, 1972, 1976 R/Up 1974, 1975
 World Pairs Champion 1969, 1970 R/Up 1971, 1972, 1978, 1981
 Speedway World Team Cup Champion 1968, 1971, 1972, 1979
 European Champion 1966, 1970, 1971, 1975
 British Champion 1968, 1970, 1971, 1972
 Intercontinental Champion 1975
 New Zealand Champion 1974, 1981
 New Zealand Long Track Champion 1983, 1984, 1985, 1986
 New Zealand South Island Champion 1977, 1981, 1983
 Australasian Champion 1977, 1981
 Australasian Grand Prix winner 1970, 1971, 1972
 Sunday Times King of Claremont winner 1973, 1980, 1981, 1983
 British-Nordic Champion 1968, 1971
 British League Riders Champion 1971, 1973
 Embassy Internationale Winner 1970, 1971, 1972
 Northern Riders Champion 1964, 1967, 1968, 1969, 1972, 1980
 Provincial League Riders Champion 1963, 1964
 Lubos Tomicek Memorial Trophy Winner 1971, 1972, 1973, 1979
 Silver Sash Match Race Champion 1968, 1969
 Golden Helmet Match Race Champion 1970
 Scottish Open Champion 1970, 1971, 1972, 1973
 Scotianapolis Winner 1969, 1970
 Welsh Open Champion 1964, 1973
 Westernapolis Winner 1968, 1968, 1971, 1972, 1973, 1975
 Leningrad Cup (USSR) Winner 1969
 Lokeren Memorial Trophy Winner 1970
 Golden Key of Bremen 1968, 1969, 1970, 1971, 1972, 1973, 1974, 1975
 Australian Long Track Champion 1962
 Victorian State Champion (Australia) 1962, 1963
 Queensland State Champion (Australia) 1962
 Western Australian State Champion 1973
 Yorkshire Television Trophy 1975, 1978, 1979, 1980
 Lada Indoor International 1979
 British Long Track Champion 1980
 World Champion of Champions Match Race Series 1989
 South Australian 150 Jubilee Trophy 1986

Speedway World Final appearances

Individual World Championship
 1966 –  Gothenburg, Ullevi – 4th – 11pts
 1967 –  London, Wembley Stadium – 3rd – 13pts
 1968 –  Gothenburg, Ullevi – Winner – 15pts
 1969 –  London, Wembley Stadium – Winner – 14pts
 1970 –  Wroclaw, Olympic Stadium – Winner – 15pts
 1971 –  Gothenburg, Ullevi – 2nd – 12pts+3pts
 1972 –  London, Wembley Stadium – Winner – 13pts+3pts
 1973 –  Chorzów, Silesian Stadium – 2nd – 13pts + F
 1974 –  Gothenburg, Ullevi – 2nd – 11pts + 3pts
 1975 –  London, Wembley Stadium – 4th – 12pts + 2pts
 1976 –  Chorzów, Silesian Stadium – 4th – 11pts
 1977 –  Gothenburg, Ullevi – Winner – 14pts
 1978 –  London, Wembley Stadium – 8th – 8pts
 1979 –  Chorzów, Silesian Stadium – Winner – 14pts

World Pairs Championship
 1969* –  Stockholm, Gubbängens IP (with Bob Andrews) – Winner – 28pts (18)
 1970 –  Malmö, Malmö Stadion (with Ronnie Moore) – Winner – 28pts (12)
 1971 –  Rybnik, Rybnik Municipal Stadium (with Barry Briggs) – 2nd – 25pts (12)
 1972 –  Borås (with Ronnie Moore) – 2nd – 24pts (14)
 1973 –  Borås (with Grahame Stapleton) – 7th – 10pts (8)
 1974 –  Manchester, Hyde Road (with Barry Briggs) – 3rd – 21pts (17)
 1976 –  Eskilstuna, Eskilstuna Motorstadion (with Barry Briggs) – 5th – 15pts (8)
 1977 –  Manchester, Hyde Road (with Larry Ross) – 5th – 17pts (16)
 1978 –  Chorzów, Silesian Stadium (with Larry Ross) – 2nd – 24pts (12+2)
 1979 –  Vojens, Vojens Speedway Center (with Larry Ross) – 6th – 12pts (6)
 1980 –  Krsko, Matija Gubec Stadium (with Larry Ross) – 5th – 16pts (11)
 1981 –  Chorzów, Silesian Stadium (with Larry Ross) – 2nd – 22pts (12)
 1983 –  Gothenburg, Ullevi (with Larry Ross) – 7th – 11pts (7)
 1984 –  Longio, Pista Speedway (with Mitch Shirra) – 3rd – 25pts (9+2)
 1985 –  Rybnik, Rybnik Municipal Stadium (with Mitch Shirra) – 4th – 15pts (8)
* Unofficial World Championships.

World Team Cup
 1966 –  Wrocław, Olympic Stadium (with Barry Briggs / Terry Betts / Nigel Boocock / Colin Pratt) – 4th – 8pts (3)
 1967 –  Malmö, Malmö Stadion (with Ray Wilson / Barry Briggs / Eric Boocock / Colin Pratt) – 3rd= – 19pts (2)
 1968 –  London, Wembley Stadium  (with Barry Briggs / Nigel Boocock / Martin Ashby / Norman Hunter) – Winner – 40pts (12)
 1969 –  Rybnik, Rybnik Municipal Stadium (with Martin Ashby / Nigel Boocock / Barry Briggs / Pete Smith) – 2nd – 27pts (9)
 1970 –  London, Wembley Stadium  (with Barry Briggs / Nigel Boocock / Eric Boocock / Ray Wilson) – 2nd – 31pts (9)
 1971 –  Wroclaw, Olympic Stadium (with Jim Airey / Ray Wilson / Barry Briggs / Ronnie Moore) – Winner – 37pts (10)
 1972 –  Olching, Olching Speedwaybahn (with Ray Wilson / Terry Betts / John Louis / Ronnie Moore) Winner – 36pts (11)
 1979 –  London, White City Stadium (with Larry Ross / Mitch Shirra / Bruce Cribb / Roger Abel) – Winner – 35pts (9)
* 1966–1972 as a member of Great Britain. 1979 with New Zealand

World Longtrack Championship

Finals

 1971 –  Oslo (Champion) 27pts
 1972 –  Mühldorf (Champion) 30pts
 1974 –  Scheeßel (Second) 26pts
 1975 –  Gornja Radgona (Second) 22pts
 1976 –  Marianske Lazne (Champion) 26pts
 1977 –  Aalborg (9th) 12pts
 1978 –  Mühldorf (4th) 24pts (lost a run-off to Peter Collins)
 1979 –  Marianske Lazne (10th) 8pts
 1980 –  Scheeßel (8th) 9pts
 1981 –  Gornja Radgona (11th) 6pts
 1982 –  Esbjerg (6th) 14pt
 1983 –  Marianske Lazne (9th) 11pts
 1984 –  Herxheim (13th) 5pts
 1985 –  Esbjerg (15th) 4pts

Grasstrack

Among Mauger's many honours he also took his share on grass. These included titles in the Bewdley Bonanza, the Lydden International and the Western Winner.

Guinness Book of Records
Most Individual Championship wins – 9 (6 Speedway / 3 Long track),
First person to win World Speedway and Long track Championships in the same year – 1972,
Only person to win 3 Individual World Championships in succession – 1968, 1969 and 1970,
Most individual World Speedway wins – 6 (joint with Tony Rickardsson)
Most World Championship Finals appearances with 52,
First person to win World Speedway, World Long track, World Pairs, and World Team Cup Championships (achieved in 1971 with World Long track win)

References

External links 

 Official site
 Authorised tribute site 
 Circuits of Gold – full-length documentary available to view on NZ On Screen. This documentary includes interviews with Mauger and his family and covers his long career, from his boy racer beginnings to his Western Springs Stadium farewell and a tribute from David Lange.  (Requires Adobe Flash)
 Short bio
 New Zealand Sports Hall of Fame
 http://grasstrackgb.co.uk/ivan-mauger/

1939 births
2018 deaths
New Zealand speedway riders
Individual Speedway World Champions
Speedway World Pairs Champions
New Zealand Officers of the Order of the British Empire
Wimbledon Dons riders
Newcastle Diamonds riders
Belle Vue Aces riders
Exeter Falcons riders
Hull Vikings riders
Eastbourne Eagles riders
Rye House Rockets riders
New Zealand motorcycle racers
British Speedway Championship winners
Sportspeople from Christchurch
Individual Speedway Long Track World Championship riders
Bachop-Mauger family